The seventh series of Mam talent! began airing on TVN on 6 September 2014. The judges' auditions began on 9 June 2014 in Katowice and ended on 8 July in Warsaw.

Golden buzzer
This series will see the introduction of the new golden buzzer, following the concept of the original British series Britain's Got Talent and Germany's Got Talent. During the auditions, as well as the standard buzzers, there was a golden buzzer placed in the centre of the judges' desk. Each judge was allowed to press this buzzer only once, which would automatically send that auditionee straight through to the live semi-finals, regardless of the opinions of the other judges. Presenters Szymon Hołownia and Marcin Prokop were also allowed to press the golden buzzer each once, which means that at most five auditionees were guaranteed their place in the semi-finals this way.

Foremniak used the golden buzzer on the first episode, pressing it during Wrocław auditions, for breakdance and contemporary dancer Pielgrzym. Prokop's pressing of the buzzer for dance troupe Barbie Boom in Gdańsk aired on the second episode, followed by Egurrola's buzz for Chechen dance troupe Lovzar on the third episode. Chylińska pressing the buzzer for singer Mateusz Guzowski in Wrocław aired on the fifth episode.

Auditions

Open Auditions
Open auditions began on 5 April 2014 in Zabrze and concluded on 25 May 2014 in Warsaw. Additional auditions in Kraków and Zakopane were announced on 25 April 2014.  This is the first series where open auditions were held in Białystok, Zielona Góra, Kraków and Zakopane.

Judges' auditions
Judges' auditions with a live audience began on 9 and 10 June in Silesian Theatre in Katowice. These were followed by auditions held in Wrocław, Gdańsk, Kraków and Warsaw.

Semi-finals
The live semi-finals will begin on 25 October 2014. Unlike previous years, it will take place in Transcolor Studio in Szeligi.

Semi-finalists

Semi-finals summary

Semi-final 1 (25 October)
Guest performer: Tetiana Galitsyna

Semi-final 2 (9 November)
Guest performer: Marcin Marczewski "Patenciarz" (season 2, finalist)

Semi-final 3 (16 November)
Guest performer: Trio ETC  (season 5, finalist)

Semi-final 4 (22 November)
Guest performer: MultiVisual (season 5, finalist)

Semi-final 5 (29 November)

Guest performer:Santiago Gil (season 6, finalist)

Final (6 December)

Ratings

References

Mam talent!
2014 Polish television seasons